Hoseynabad (also Romanized as Ḩoseynābād; also known as Husainābād) is a village in Jarqavieh Vosta Rural District, Jarqavieh Sofla District, Isfahan County, Isfahan Province, Iran. At the 2006 census, its population was 929, in 249 families. In the 2018 census, its population was 860, in 226 families.

References 

Populated places in Isfahan County